Cross School is a historic one-room school building located in Washington Township, Morgan County, Indiana.  It was built in 1856, and is a simple one-story, rectangular, brick building with a gable roof. It features segmental arched openings.  It operated as a rural school until 1941, then housed a Sunday school for 25 years.  It was restored in 1976

It was listed on the National Register of Historic Places in 1983.

References

One-room schoolhouses in Indiana
School buildings on the National Register of Historic Places in Indiana
School buildings completed in 1856
Buildings and structures in Morgan County, Indiana
National Register of Historic Places in Morgan County, Indiana